National Republican Guard may refer to:

 National Republican Guard (Portugal)
 National Republican Guard (Spain)
 National Republican Guard (Italy)
 National Republican Guard (The Gambia)

See also
 Republican National Guard (disambiguation)